, provisional designation , is a trans-Neptunian object (TNO) discovered by David Rabinowitz on December 17, 2009, at the La Silla Observatory in Chile.

Orbit

Classification
 is a classical Kuiper belt object: Its orbit is not controlled by an orbital resonance with Neptune, similar to 15760 Albion, but with a much greater orbital eccentricity and inclination. It completes one orbit around the Sun in just over 247 Earth years, at an average distance of about 44 AU. It came to perihelion around 1868, and to aphelion in 2015. It is currently about 50.7 AU from the Sun, and will again return to perihelion around 2163.

Precovery

 has been observed 70 times, with precovery images dating back to 2006, and has an orbital quality code of 4.

Physical characteristics

Absolute magnitude

The size of an object can be ascertained once its absolute magnitude (H) and its albedo (the proportion of light it reflects) are known.  When  was first discovered, it was believed to have an absolute magnitude (H) of 2.8, which would have made it the first bright KBO found from the southern hemisphere.  has an absolute magnitude (H) of 4.5. Since  has an absolute magnitude dimmer than (H=1), it will not be overseen by two naming committees and will not automatically be listed as a dwarf planet by the International Astronomical Union (IAU). This value would've made it the eighth-intrinsically brightest known trans-Neptunian object, but it was later found to be much dimmer. It has an absolute magnitude (H) of 4.5, which would make it a good dwarf-planet candidate when using an albedo of 0.09. However, it is probably much smaller than previously thought, since it is also suspected of being a highly reflective icy member of the Haumea family.

 has been found to be a member of the Haumea family fragment due to its Haumea-like orbit and the detection of water ice on its surface. However, its actual albedo is unknown; if its albedo turns out to be lower, it would result in a larger size estimate.

Many small icy low-density moons, such as Mimas and Miranda are known to be spherical.

See also
 , known Haumea-family member
 Spitzer dwarf-planet candidates with estimated diameter > 
List of Solar System objects most distant from the Sun

References

External links 
 

Haumea family
Scattered disc and detached objects
2009 YE7
Possible dwarf planets
20091217